Prus I is a Polish coat of arms. It was used by a number of  szlachta (noble) families under the Polish–Lithuanian Commonwealth.

History

Blazon

Notable bearers 
Notable bearers of this coat of arms have included:

Bolesław Prus (Aleksander Głowacki)
Eligiusz Niewiadomski
Waclaw Szybalski
Stanislaw Klicki
Joseph Mruk
Julius Budwilowitz.

External links 
  Prus Coat of Arms and bearers 
  Prus Coat of Arms and bearers

See also
 Prus II Wilczekosy coat of arms
 Prus III coat of arms
 Polish heraldry
 Heraldry
 Coat of arms
 List of Polish nobility coats of arms

Sources 
 Dynastic Genealogy
 Ornatowski.com
 Wittyg, Wiktor: Nieznana szlachta polska i jej herby
-

References 

Prus